The 2011–12 CWHL season was the fifth in league history. Regular season play begun on October 22, 2011, as the defending champion Montreal Stars hosted the Brampton Thunder. The league expanded from five teams to six as Team Alberta (CWHL) joined the league for competitive play. The 2012 Clarkson Cup in Niagara Falls was also contested between the Stars and Thunder, with Montreal winning its second consecutive title.

Offseason

News and notes
 April 19: The league announced on April 19, 2011, that it would merge with the Western Women's Hockey League for the 2011-12 season. The merger featured one team based in Edmonton and Calgary and was a combination of the former WWHL franchises the Edmonton Chimos and Strathmore Rockies. The team would play their games in various locations around Alberta. Strathmore Rockies founder Samantha Holmes-Domagala, joined the sponsorship division of the CWHL to look after the requirements of the expansion team.
 July 21, 2011: Philanthropist Joan Snyder donated $2 million to Winsport Canada. The goal was to ensure priority rink access to female hockey players at all levels, and to help expand the Canadian Women's Hockey League with the creation of Team Alberta. Part of the donation would cover the new addition to the Athletic and Ice Complex at Canada Olympic Park in Calgary. This would serve as the future home to Hockey Canada. In addition, there would be four hockey rinks, one of which would aptly be named the Joan Snyder Rink. Team Alberta would benefit with the allocation of free practice time, and a dressing room exclusive to the club.

CWHL Draft
The following are the first ten overall picks in the CWHL Draft. For further detail, please see 2011 CWHL Draft

NCAA exhibition

 On November 2, 2011, Scanzano was on loan from the Toronto Furies, as she appeared in one game for the Brampton Thunder. The game was an exhibition contest versus her alma mater, the Mercyhurst Lakers. In the second period of said contest, Scanzano scored the game-winning goal as the Thunder defeated the Lakers by a 3-1 tally.

Regular season

News and notes
 October 13, 2011: The CWHL participated in two charity hockey games for cancer research at Windsor Arena. The event was called 'Stick It To Cancer' and the Montreal Stars competed versus the Toronto Furies in two games on Nov. 26 and 27. The campaign was organized in partnership by the CWHL, along with Breast Ride Ever, a not-for-profit organization. Proceeds from the games benefitted local cancer programs and the Hospice of Windsor and Essex County.
 On November 18, 2011, several Burlington Barracudas players (including Christina Kessler, Shannon Moulson, Ashley Stephenson, Jana Harrigan, Amanda Shaw, Annina Rajahuhta, Samantha Shirley,   Amanda Parkins, and Lindsay Vine) competed in the first ever Hockey Helps the Homeless Women's Tournament, held at the Magna Centre in Newmarket, Ontario.
 On November 19, at Montreal, the second annual "Game on to beat breast cancer" benefit. The target to surpass the previous year's donation results was far exceeded. A new attendance record was also set at the game, with over 1,100 fans in the stands.
 On December 8, Montréal Stars offered a cheque for close to $15,000 to the Quebec Breast Cancer Foundation
 Barracudas players Christina Kessler and Shannon Moulson were part of an event at Power Play Sports in Niagara Falls, Ontario on December 20, 2011 to promote the 2012 Clarkson Cup (to be held in Niagara Falls). After the event, they met players from the NFGHA (Niagara Falls Girls Hockey League) for photographs and autographs.

Season standings
Note: GP = Games played, W = Wins, L = Losses, T = Ties, OTL = Overtime losses, GF = Goals for, GA = Goals against, Pts = Points.

Team Alberta CWHL played only half of the number of regular matches. This was because of the geographical estrangement. Points were consequently adjusted with another teams.

Reference

League leaders

Scoring leaders

Goaltending leaders

Reference

Awards and honours
The 2012 CWHL Awards Banquet was held on Mar. 21, 2012 in Niagara Falls, ON (during the
Clarkson Cup weekend). That night, the league formally recognized the Angela James Bowl winner, the Most Valuable Player, the Goaltender of the Year, the Rookie of the Year, and the Coach of the Year.
 Most Valuable Player: Meghan Agosta, Montreal
 Angela James Bowl: Top Scorer Meghan Agosta, Montreal
 Outstanding Rookie: Courtney Birchard, Brampton
 Coach of the Year: Lauren McAuliffe, Boston

CWHL Top Players
 Top Forward: Meghan Agosta, Montreal
 Top Defender: Catherine Ward, Montreal
 Top Goaltender: Molly Schaus, Boston

CWHL All-Stars
First Team All-Stars
 Goaltender: Molly Schaus, Boston
 Defender: Catherine Ward, Montreal
 Defender: Molly Engstrom, Brampton
 Forward: Meghan Agosta, Montreal
 Forward: Caroline Ouellette, Montreal
 Forward: Kelli Stack, Boston
Second Team All-Stars
 Goaltender: Jenny Lavigne, Montreal
 Defender: Gigi Marvin, Boston
 Defender: Tessa Bonhomme, Toronto
 Forward: Gillian Apps, Brampton
 Forward: Jayna Hefford, Brampton
 Forward: Vanessa Davidson, Montreal

CWHL All-Rookie Team
 Goaltender: Molly Schaus, Boston
 Defender: Catherine Ward, Montreal
 Defender: Courtney Birchard, Brampton
 Forward: Meghan Agosta, Montreal
 Forward: Kelli Stack, Boston
 Forward: Erika Lawler, Boston

CWHL Monthly Top Scorer
 October: Kelli Stack, Boston
 November: Caroline Ouellette, Montreal
 December: Meghan Agosta, Montreal
 January: Meghan Agosta, Montreal
 February: Meghan Agosta, Montreal
 March: Gillian Apps, Brampton

Postseason

The postseason was held at the Gale Centre in Niagara Falls, Ontario. All teams played in a round robin to determine the contestants in the Clarkson Cup finals.

Clarkson Cup

References